Fechtig is an unincorporated community in Hampton County, South Carolina, United States.

On April 13, 2020, a tornado measuring EF4 on the Enhanced Fujita Scale traveled across Hampton County from near Scotia to near Fechtig. The tornado was part of the 2020 Easter tornado outbreak.

References

Unincorporated communities in Hampton County, South Carolina
Unincorporated communities in South Carolina